Raja Balwant Singh College is located at Bichpuri, Agra, Uttar Pradesh, India. The college is affiliated to Dr. Bhimrao Ambedkar University, Agra and Dr. A.P.J. Abdul Kalam Technical University, Lucknow.

The college has its beginning as a small boarding house for the Rajput community in 1885, before becoming a high school in 1899, an Intermediate College in 1928, and a Degree College in 1940. It  is the first college in India to award a postgraduate degree in agriculture.

RBS College has eight faculties - Arts, Commerce, Education, Science, Agriculture, Engineering pharmacy and Technology, and Management and Computer Application, and six campuses - three in Agra itself besides Bichpuri, Mathura and Awagarh.

History

Established in 1885, Raja Balvant Singh College owes its existence to Raja Balwant Singh of Awagarh who enabled the institution to grow as one of the oldest and biggest colleges of Uttar Pradesh.

Raja Balwant Singh College, formerly known as Balwant Rajput College, was started with the help of Raja Balwant Singh of Awagarh Estate, Etah, Uttar Pradesh. It started in 1878 as Rajput Boarding House for education and upliftment of Rajputs of India. In 1885, it was upgraded as Balwant Rajput High School in 1899, with Col. Dobson and Sir E.H. Forsyth as headmasters, and Rajput community given preference.

In 1949 R.K. Singh started the Rural Engineering Institute at Bichpuri.

A research lab for space science and seismo-electromagnetics is running on the Bichpuri campus and headed by Dr. Birbal Singh.

Notable alumni

Mulayam Singh Yadav 
Ram Gopal Yadav
Shilendra Kumar Singh, IAS and Ex-Governor of Rajasthan
Raj Babbar (Actor and Politician)

References

External links
Vinimaya
Abhudaya
BatchMates

Agricultural universities and colleges in Uttar Pradesh
Engineering colleges in Uttar Pradesh
Science colleges in India
Arts colleges in India
Universities and colleges in Agra
Educational institutions established in 1885
1885 establishments in India
Dr. A.P.J. Abdul Kalam Technical University